Charles Augustin Chaynes (11 July 1925 – 24 June 2016) was a French composer.

Biography 
Chaynes was born in Toulouse in 1925. He studied at the Conservatoire de Paris with Darius Milhaud and Jean Rivier. In 1951 he won  the Prix de Rome with the cantata Et l'homme se vit les portes rouvrir. During his stay at the Villa Medici in Rome he wrote the First Concerto for String Orchestra and the Ode for a Tragic Death.

In 1956 he became a producer at the Radiodiffusion Télévision Française (RTF). In 1964 he succeeded Marius Constant as head of the channel France Musique. From 1975 to 1990 he headed the service de la création musicale at Radio France.

In addition to several operas, one symphony and chamber works Chaynes composed numerous concertos, etc. for trumpet, violin, piano and organ, and two orchestral concerts. In 1966 he composed a concerto for organ, string orchestra, timpani and percussion for Marie-Claire Alain. His Piano Concerto was premiered in 1967 by Yvonne Loriod, the wife of Olivier Messiaen.

He died on 24 June 2016 in Saint-Mandé at the age of 90.

Selected works 
 Symphony (1955)
 Concerto for organ, string orchestra, timpani and percussion (1966)
 Piano Concerto (1966)
 Alternances for viola and piano (1966)

Honours 
Chaynes was inter alia the Grand Prix Musical of Paris (1965), the Prix du Disque of the Académie du disque français (1968, 1970, 1975 and 1981), the Prix de la Tribune internationale des compositeurs UNESCO (1976), the Prix Musical de la SACD (1988) and the Orphée d'Or of the Académie du Disque Lyrique (1996 and 2003). He was awarded officer of the Legion of Honour, the Ordre national du Mérite and Commander of the Ordre des Arts et des Lettres. In 2005 he became a member of the Académie des Beaux-Arts.

  : Commander of the Order of Cultural Merit (November 1999)

References

External links 
 Official Website of Charles Chaynes www.charleschaynes.com

1925 births
2016 deaths
Musicians from Toulouse
French classical composers
French male classical composers
20th-century classical composers
Conservatoire de Paris alumni
Prix de Rome for composition
Commandeurs of the Ordre des Arts et des Lettres
Officers of the Ordre national du Mérite
Officiers of the Légion d'honneur
Members of the Académie des beaux-arts
Commanders of the Order of Cultural Merit (Monaco)
Pupils of Darius Milhaud